In mathematics, a genus of a multiplicative sequence is a ring homomorphism from the ring of smooth compact manifolds up to the equivalence of bounding a smooth manifold with boundary (i.e., up to suitable cobordism) to another ring, usually the rational numbers, having the property that they are constructed from a sequence of polynomials in characteristic classes that arise as coefficients in formal power series with good multiplicative properties.

Definition
A genus  assigns a number  to each manifold X such that
  (where  is the disjoint union);
 ;
   if X is the boundary of a manifold with boundary. 

The manifolds and manifolds with boundary may be required to have additional structure; for example, they might be oriented, spin, stably complex, and so on (see list of cobordism theories for many more examples).

The conditions on   can be rephrased as saying that  is a ring homomorphism from the cobordism ring of manifolds (with additional structure) to another ring. 

Example: If  is the signature of the oriented manifold X, then  is a genus from oriented manifolds to the ring of integers.

The genus associated to a formal power series

A sequence of polynomials  in variables  is called multiplicative if

 

implies that

If  is a formal power series in z with constant term 1, we can define a multiplicative sequence 

 

by 

,

where  is the kth elementary symmetric function of the indeterminates . (The variables  will often in practice be Pontryagin classes.)

The genus  of compact, connected, smooth, oriented manifolds corresponding to Q is given by

A theorem of René Thom, which states that the rationals tensored with the cobordism ring is a polynomial algebra in generators of degree 4k for positive integers k, implies that this gives a bijection between formal power series Q with rational coefficients and leading coefficient 1, and genera from oriented manifolds to the rational numbers.

L genus
The L genus is the genus of the formal power series 

where the numbers  are the Bernoulli numbers. The first few values are: 

(for further L-polynomials see  or ). Now let M be a closed smooth oriented manifold of dimension 4n with Pontrjagin classes .

. 

This is now known as the Hirzebruch signature theorem (or sometimes the Hirzebruch index theorem). 

The fact that  is always integral for a smooth manifold was used by John Milnor to give an example of an 8-dimensional PL manifold with no smooth structure.

Application on K3 surfaces 
It can be computed as -48 using the tangent sequence and comparisons with complex chern classes. Since , we have its signature. This can be used to compute its intersection form as a unimodular lattice since it has , and using the classification of unimodular lattices.

Todd genus
The Todd genus is the genus of the formal power series 

The first few values are 

The Todd genus has the particular property that it assigns the value 1 to all complex projective spaces (i.e. ), and this suffices to show that the Todd genus agrees with the arithmetic genus for algebraic varieties as the arithmetic genus is also 1 for complex projective spaces. This observation is a consequence of the Hirzebruch–Riemann–Roch theorem, and in fact is one of the key developments that led to the formulation of that theorem.

Â genus
The Â genus is the genus associated to the characteristic power series

(There is also an Â genus which is less commonly used, associated to the characteristic series .) The first few values are

The Â genus of a spin manifold is an integer, and an even integer if the dimension is 4 mod 8 (which in dimension 4 implies Rochlin's theorem) – for general manifolds, the Â genus is not always an integer. This was proven by Hirzebruch and Armand Borel; this result both motivated and was later explained by the Atiyah–Singer index theorem, which showed that the Â genus of a spin manifold is equal to the index of its Dirac operator.

By combining this index result with a Weitzenbock formula for the Dirac Laplacian, André Lichnerowicz deduced that if a compact spin manifold admits a metric with positive scalar curvature, its Â genus must vanish. This only gives an obstruction to positive scalar curvature when the dimension is a multiple of 4, but Nigel Hitchin later discovered an analogous -valued obstruction in dimensions 1 or 2 mod 8. These results are essentially sharp. Indeed, Mikhail Gromov, H. Blaine Lawson, and Stephan Stolz later proved that the Â genus and Hitchin's -valued analog are the only obstructions to the existence of positive-scalar-curvature metrics on simply-connected spin manifolds of dimension greater than or equal to 5.

Elliptic genus
A genus is called an elliptic genus if the power series  satisfies the condition 

(As usual, Q is the characteristic power series of the genus.)

One explicit expression for f(z) is

where

and sn is the Jacobi elliptic function.

Examples:

. This is the L-genus.
. This is the Â genus.
. This is a generalization of the L-genus.

The first few values of such genera are:

Example (elliptic genus for quaternionic projective plane) :

Example (elliptic genus for octonionic projective plane, or Cayley plane):

Witten genus
The Witten genus is the genus associated to the characteristic power series

where σL is the Weierstrass sigma function for the lattice L, and G is a multiple of an Eisenstein series. 

The Witten genus of a 4k dimensional compact oriented smooth spin manifold with vanishing first Pontryagin class is a modular form of weight 2k, with integral Fourier coefficients.

See also
 Atiyah–Singer index theorem
 List of cohomology theories

Notes

References
Friedrich Hirzebruch Topological Methods in Algebraic Geometry  Text of the original German version: http://hirzebruch.mpim-bonn.mpg.de/120/6/NeueTopologischeMethoden_2.Aufl.pdf
 Friedrich Hirzebruch, Thomas Berger, Rainer Jung Manifolds and Modular Forms 
Milnor, Stasheff, Characteristic classes, 

Topological methods of algebraic geometry
Complex manifolds